The Women's elimination race was held on 18 October 2015.

Results

References

Women's elimination race
European Track Championships – Women's elimination race